Philippe Favre (11 December 1961 − 6 December 2013) was a Swiss racing driver He lived in Geneva.

Favre was killed in a skiing accident at Val Thorens in France five days before his 52nd birthday on 6 December 2013.

References

1961 births
2013 deaths
Swiss racing drivers
International Formula 3000 drivers
Japanese Formula 3000 Championship drivers
Indy Lights drivers
IMSA GT Championship drivers
24 Hours of Le Mans drivers
Skiing deaths

British Formula Three Championship drivers
Alan Docking Racing drivers